Ascension is the third studio album by the British post-metal band Jesu. The album was released on 10 May 2011 through Caldo Verde Records. Ascension is the first full-length studio album released by Jesu since 2007's Conqueror. On 8 June 2011, Daymare Recordings released the album in Japan with a bonus disc containing four additional tracks unavailable on the original release. In August 2018, the album was reissued on vinyl via American record label Robotic Empire and featured brand new mixes for each song by Justin Broadrick, as well as new mastering provided by John Golden of Golden Mastering.

Track listing

Personnel
 Justin Broadrick – guitars, bass, vocals, keyboards
 Ted Parsons – drums, percussion

References

Jesu (band) albums
2011 albums
Caldo Verde Records albums